Saros cycle series 130 for lunar eclipses occurs at the moon's ascending node, repeats every 18 years  days.
The 130th lunar saros is associated with Solar Saros 137.

Lunar saros 130 contains 71 member events, with all eclipses in which the penumbral (or eclipse) magnitude is over 0.01 . It has 14 total eclipses, starting in 1921 and ending in 2155.

Solar saros 137 interleaves with the 130th lunar saros, with an event occurring every 9 years 5 days alternating between each saros series. It consisted of 8 penumbral eclipses, 20 partial eclipses, 14 total eclipses, 22 partial eclipses, and ends with 7 penumbral eclipses.

This lunar saros is linked to Solar Saros 137.

Summary

List

See also 
 List of lunar eclipses
 List of Saros series for lunar eclipses

Notes

External links 
 www.hermit.org: Saros 130

Lunar saros series